From Cradle to Stage is an American documentary television series created by Dave Grohl, based on the autobiographical novel From Cradle to Stage: Stories from the Mothers Who Rocked and Raised Rock Stars by his mother Virginia Grohl. The series premiered on Paramount+ on May 6, 2021.

Development 
After the success of Grohl's 2013 documentary film Sound City, he expressed interest to Billboard of doing something similar.

Episodes

See also 
 Foo Fighters: Sonic Highways - a rockumentary series directed by Grohl and released on HBO.

References

External links 

2020s American documentary television series
2020s American television series
2021 American television series debuts
2021 American television series endings
Documentary television series about music
Paramount+ original programming
Rockumentaries
Works by Dave Grohl